Sherman Oaks Hospital (SOH) is a 153-bed acute care facility on Van Nuys Boulevard in the city of Los Angeles neighborhood of Sherman Oaks, California. It had 3,995 admissions during the most recent year such data was made available.

SOH is owned and operated by Prime Healthcare Services, a hospital management company located in Victorville, California; it was founded in 2001 by Prem Reddy, who acts as its chairman of the board.

Sherman Oaks Hospital is accredited by the American Osteopathic Association's Healthcare Facilities Accreditation Program.

The hospital is the former home of the well-known Grossman Burn Center, which—after being in the hospital for forty years—moved fourteen miles away in 2010 to West Hills Hospital and Medical Center.

Services
24-hour basic emergency
Cardiovascular-Neurological
Cardiovascular Lab
Imaging Services - Digital Filmless Radiology
Clinical Lab
Critical Care/Stepdown Unit
Surgical Services
Pharmacy
Outpatient Physical Therapy
Bio-Medical
Partial Hospitalization Program and Intensive Outpatient Program

References

External links
SOH official website
Prime Healthcare Services, Inc.
Prem Reddy, MD, FACC, FCCP

Hospital buildings completed in 1969
Hospitals in Los Angeles
Hospitals in the San Fernando Valley
Prime Healthcare Services
Sherman Oaks, Los Angeles